Vanilla Islands (French: Les Îles Vanille) is an affiliation of the islands of Seychelles, Madagascar, Réunion (France), Mauritius, Comoros and Mayotte (France) in the Indian Ocean to form a new travel destination brand. The aim of the co-operation that was founded on August 4, 2010 at La Réunion is to pool forces and market the region as a combined tourism destination, rather than market each island individually as was done in the past.

See also 
 Vanilla Alliance

References

External links 
  Official Vanilla Islands website
 Vanilla Islands Pages

Tourism in Madagascar
Tourism in Seychelles
Tourism in Réunion
Tourism in Mauritius